Speak of the Devil: The Canon of Anton LaVey is a documentary film about Church of Satan founder Anton LaVey, released in 1993 through Wavelength Video and directed by Nick Bougas.

It contains footage of LaVey including interviews and performances, a tour of his San Francisco home, known as "The Black House", and a look into his ritual chamber, music room, library, and the personal retreat he called the "Den of Iniquity".

References

External links

Documentary films about religion in the United States
American documentary films
1993 films
Church of Satan
1993 documentary films
Films directed by Nick Bougas
1990s English-language films
1990s American films